Fernando Vives Solar (1871–1935) was a Chilean Jesuit known as one of the foremost advocates of the Catholic social teachings in Chile. Vives influenced a generation of young men including Alberto Hurtado, Clotario Blest and future historian Jaime Eyzaguirre. His advocacy for social questions was not well received among the conservative elites who forced Vives to leave the country in 1918 for an exile in Spain until 1931 when he returned to Chile.

References

19th-century Chilean Jesuits
20th-century Chilean Jesuits
Chilean schoolteachers
Chilean exiles
Jesuit exiles
1871 births
1935 deaths
20th-century Chilean educators